The Ohio State University at Marion (OSU Marion or OSUM) is a satellite campus of Ohio State University in Marion, Ohio. The campus was founded in 1957. There are eight buildings on the campus.

The Marion campus practices open admissions. Its average class size is 19. An average age of students is 23.5. The Marion Campus Library of the OSU Marion Campus contains over 48,000 books, a large reference collection, and over 300 subscriptions. The library collection also includes print periodical indexes, microforms, maps, newspapers, pamphlet file, special collections in careers and children's literature, and the Warren G. Harding/Norman Thomas Research Collection.  It provides access to all the resources of the Ohio State University and Ohio Link.

About 88% of students at the Marion campus are awarded federal or state financial aid. The student body is 53% female and 47% male. The Academy Program at the campus provides the opportunity for qualified students to enroll in college while still in high school as part of Ohio's College Credit Plus program. The Alber Enterprise Center is a campus-based corporate education center that provides workforce training, organization development, and performance improvement techniques.

Academics

Students may complete one to three years of study in any of the Ohio State University’s 200+ majors (available coursework varies by major) in Marion before making the transition to the Columbus campus to complete their degree. Several bachelor's programs and an Associate of Arts can be completed entirely at the Marion campus.

Athletics
On December 2, 2006, Lincoln University defeated Ohio State Marion in basketball with a final score of 201-78. This set new all-time NCAA Division III basketball records for points scored (201), points in a half (104), largest margin of victory (123), shots made (78), and shots taken (141).

The Marion campus does not currently offer varsity athletic teams. A club level soccer team is active on the campus.

Student life

Student organizations
There are over 30 student clubs on campus.

Sport clubs and intramural sports
Students at the Marion Campus can participate in several intramural sports such as basketball, softball, and volleyball.

References

External links 

Official website

Marion Campus, Ohio State University
Educational institutions established in 1957
Education in Marion County, Ohio
Buildings and structures in Marion, Ohio
1957 establishments in Ohio